Labbézanga is a village in Mali, located on an island in the Niger River, bordering Niger.

Military

The Malian Armed Forces operated a border post at Labbézanga.

Between June and August 2020, the French Armed Forces erected a bastion fort in Labbézanga. The camp was shifted to the Malian Armed Forces on July 23, 2020.

References

Populated places in Gao Region